Vishal Misra is an Indian-American scientist at Columbia University, New York, NY and known for his numerous contributions to Computer Networking. He was named Fellow of the Institute of Electrical and Electronics Engineers (IEEE) in 2016 for contributions to network traffic modeling, congestion control and Internet economics. He was elected as an ACM Fellow in 2018. In 2019, he was designated a Distinguished Alumnus of IIT Bombay, from which he graduated in 1992.

He is a Professor in the Computer Science and Electrical Engineering Departments at Columbia University. He is also an entrepreneur, having co-founded the world's most popular single sport portal ESPNCricinfo, where he designed and implemented the world's  first live sport scorecard system on the Internet  in 1996. In 2011 he founded the data center storage company Infinio.

As a researcher, he developed the first stochastic differential equation (fluid) model of TCP that led to formal control theoretic analysis of congestion control mechanisms on the Internet. Based on his work a team at Cisco developed the PIE (PI enhanced) controller that is being used to solve the problem of bufferbloat (excessive delays on the Internet because of larger than needed buffers). The PIE controller has become a part of the DOCSIS 3.1.

He has also worked on the topic of Network neutrality, and worked actively with both the citizen's movement and the regulators in India. The pro-net neutrality citizen's movement adopted his definition of Net Neutrality, and eventually the regulators in India passed regulations that are consistent with his definition, recognized as the strongest Net Neutrality protections anywhere in the world.

References 

Fellow Members of the IEEE
Fellows of the Association for Computing Machinery
Living people
21st-century American engineers
Year of birth missing (living people)
American electrical engineers